Quiero (Spanish for "I want" or "I love") may refer to:

 "Quiero" (Anahí song), 2010
 "Quiero" (Ricardo Arjona song), 2007
 "Quiero" (Selena song), 1988
 "Quiero", song by Julio Iglesias from the album El Amor (1975)
 "Quiero", song by Shakira from the album Pies Descalzos (1996)
 "Quiero", song by Luis Miguel from the album Amarte Es un Placer (1999)
 "Quiero", 2001 song by Jerry Rivera

See also
 Te Quiero (disambiguation)